The Strange Death of Tory England is a book of political commentary by the journalist Geoffrey Wheatcroft, published in 2005.

Outline
In the run-up to the 2005 United Kingdom general election, Wheatcroft looks at the journey of the Conservative Party, from being the country's most successful political party of the 20th century to its wilderness of a long period in opposition, by way of Margaret Thatcher's heyday and her fall from power and the quite different style of John Major.

Summary
The book begins with the Conservative leadership contest of 1963, following the resignation of Harold Macmillan, which turned into a fight between his deputy Rab Butler and the Earl of Home, the aristocratic dark horse. Home won, disclaimed his peerage, became Sir Alec Douglas-Home and was elected to the House of Commons at a hastily arranged by-election. A dismayed Iain Macleod, the modernising chairman of the party, refused to serve in Home's Cabinet and alleged that the leadership had been stitched up by a "Magic Circle" of Old Etonians. Wheatcroft depicts this contest as a clash between supporters of "the virtues of an hereditary governing class" and those of "worth proved by ability".

Next comes a history of the party from its 17th-century beginnings, at the time of the Restoration, followed by an account of the Douglas-Home, Harold Wilson and Edward Heath years and Britain's trials and tribulations of the 1970s, which culminated in the election of Margaret Thatcher's first government in 1979.

Within a few years, while holding onto power, the party began to split and fall apart. Wheatcroft seeks to explain this decline by offering factors long discussed by commentators: internal splits over Britain's place in Europe, political sleaze, a fundamental lack of ideology and a growing desire in the country for change after eighteen years of Conservative rule, coinciding with Tony Blair's "brilliant cynical sincerity".

Future
Wheatcroft finally proposes some cures for the party's ills. He considers that the UK lacks a mainstream party of the right that puts the country's own national interest first. He questions the absence of the mavericks the party used to have, giving it more life and soul, noting the example of Enoch Powell's opposition to capital punishment. Also is examined the rise of the American neoconservatives. The author suggests that the British Conservatives could learn both from them and from the Lion and Unicorn conservatism of the socialist George Orwell. He concludes:

Title
The book appears to draw its title from George Dangerfield's The Strange Death of Liberal England (1935) which sought to explain the decline of the British Liberal Party after 1910. It should also be noted that The Strange Death of Tory England had previously been used as a title by Anne Applebaum for an article published in June 2001.

Cover
The pictorial dust cover of the book's first edition shows the last Conservative prime minister, John Major, batting in a game of cricket, at the moment of being clean bowled (his wicket demolished). That alludes to Major's well-known love of cricket and to the result of the United Kingdom general election of 1997, which was won in a landslide by the Labour Party with 418 seats in the House of Commons, its highest ever total, while the Conservatives took only 165, their worst performance since the general election of 1906. In 1997, the Conservatives did not win a single seat in Scotland or in Wales. Little changed at the 2001 General Election, with Labour taking 413 seats, the Conservatives 166, the Liberal Democrats 52 and the others 28.

Reviews
The historian Sir Raymond Carr, writing in The Spectator, said:

Notes

2005 non-fiction books
Conservative Party (UK) publications
History of the Conservative Party (UK)
Books about politics of the United Kingdom
Books about politics of England